The 2017–18 Tulsa Golden Hurricane men's basketball team represented the University of Tulsa during the 2017–18 NCAA Division I men's basketball season. The Golden Hurricane, led by fourth-year head coach Frank Haith, played their home games at the Reynolds Center in Tulsa, Oklahoma as members of the American Athletic Conference. They finished the season 19–12, 12–6 in AAC play to finish in fourth place. They lost in the quarterfinals of the AAC tournament to Memphis.

Previous season
The Golden Hurricane finished the 2016–17 season 15–17, 8–10 in AAC play to finish in seventh place. They defeated Tulane in the first round of the AAC tournament to advance to the quarterfinals where they lost to Cincinnati.

Offseason

Departures

Incoming transfers

2017 recruiting class

Roster

Schedule and results

|-
!colspan=9 style=| Exhibition

|-
!colspan=9 style=| Non-conference regular season

|-
!colspan=6 style=| AAC regular season

|-
!colspan=9 style=| AAC tournament

Source

References

2017–18 American Athletic Conference men's basketball season
2017-18
2018 in sports in Oklahoma
2017 in sports in Oklahoma